The Lo-Fi Lodge is a subscription based album by Mike Doughty.  Fans were able to sign up during Spring 2012 to receive one song per week for 32 weeks. The songs included acoustic versions of previously released material, demos and alternate versions of songs, as well as songs that were never released in any form. Doughty also mentioned that the songs from the Evenhand soundtrack would finally be released through this album.

Track listing

References 

2011 albums
Mike Doughty albums
ATO Records albums